In law enforcement in the United States, a gypsy cop, also known as a wandering police officer, is a police officer who frequently transfers between police departments, having a record of misconduct or unsuitable job performance. The term is slang, referencing the stereotypical nomadic lifestyle of the Romani people, often called "Gypsies" by non-Romani.

History of the term
In use since the 1980s, the phrase entered public parlance in the 2000s after the infamous Tulia drug stings, where itinerant lawman Tom Coleman allegedly set up innocent people, most of them black, as part of a long-term undercover operation. Several other high-profile cases in states include those in Texas and Alaska that involved officers who served with adversity in close to 20 agencies in 15 years or less, yet they continued to evade administrative action as they went from agency to agency, sometimes serving as little as 30 days at one department, despite blatant misconduct and compelling signs of unsuitability to serve as peace officers. More recently in 2016 following a civil rights lawsuit against Ferguson police officer Freddie Boyd, he was found to have had a string of complaints filed against him from over 10 years earlier, including pistol whipping a child and falsifying police reports, from when he worked for the city of St. Louis. Law enforcement agency heads privately refer to the practice of giving a problematic officer a good recommendation in order to get rid of the officer while avoiding litigation, as "pass the trash".

The term comes from the Romani people (popularly known as "Gypsies"), who are stereotypically said to always be travelling and thus never get to settle down in a local community, just like how a gypsy cop never gets to stay at any given police department for long. Some dictionaries recommend against using the word gypsy as a modifier with negative connotations, because such use could be considered a slur against the Romani people.

Hiring process

Some smaller agencies often have an easier and rapid hiring process, involving only a brief interview with the mayor or chief and then a limited background investigation (fingerprint and criminal record checks), drug screen test, and physical exam. Some sheriff's offices, rural and even larger, may bypass some of those steps, as deputies are political appointees, who serve "at the will and pleasure of the elected Sheriff." The hiring process can vary greatly between jurisdictions, due to a variety of factors including budgetary constraints, the availability of existing staff, the experience of existing staff with interviewing techniques, and the number of candidates who respond to advertised positions. 
 
On the other hand, major municipal, state and federal law enforcement agencies may have a competitive waiting list for applicants and a lengthy and arduous hiring process that begins with a required minimum score on a written aptitude examination. Such tests may be given only a few times a year and the hiring process may last six to twelve months, with disqualification for cause a possibility at each of the steps along the way. These may include a credit history check, an exhaustive criminal and personal background check going back to age 16, psychological screening testing, polygraph exam, physical strength and agility testing, and a comprehensive interview panel.

In some cases, even already certified peace officers are required to redo basic law enforcement training, either partly or in full, complete a three- to six-month field training program with a veteran field training officer, and accept twelve months of "at will" probationary employment that can result in termination for any or no reason. Officers with a history of moving from agency to agency, especially at short intervals, are closely scrutinized and often rejected as applicants in larger agencies for that very reason. Difficulty in obtaining employment does not always correlate with agency size, however, as some smaller agencies in affluent communities experience very little turnover.

Causes

Fragmentation

The United States has a highly decentralized and fragmented system of law enforcement, with around 18,000 law enforcement agencies, and is regulated separately in the 50 states, plus US territories, the federal and local level as well. Hiring and disciplinary standards vary greatly between police departments, the majority of which are small in size. There is no national database of dismissed officers, who may or may not be de-certified to practice law enforcement by their jurisdictional regulatory agency, often called POST (Peace Officer Standards and Training) agencies, or by a similar agency. Some states have established a state-level database or taken other administrative measures to try to prevent dismissed officers from being rehired, but these databases are not centralized, nor do they have uniform prerequisites. The large population and land area of the country makes it further harder to notice these cases; an officer may have moved hundreds of miles away to join another agency and the new agency would be unlikely to have learned of the case in the media.

Incentives for hiring unsuitable staff
Gypsy cops usually move from agency to agency as lateral transfers, or law enforcement officers that have already been trained and certified. Lateral transfers are often preferred over new recruits as the hiring process is simplified. Some smaller agencies knowingly hire gypsy cops because they have difficulty in recruiting suitable officers. That may be because of a smaller population to recruit from, lower pay, limited training and growth potential, less exciting police activity and even less prestige. The vacancy of even one officer in a small agency of fewer than 10 officers can create substantial hardships on an agency that must provide 24-hour coverage to the community it serves. The agencies have a great incentive to fill the vacancy quickly, even if it means hiring someone unsuitable.

Incentives for concealing a misconduct dismissal

Problem officers are often allowed to resign in seemingly good standing and then go to another unsuspecting agency with a good recommendation from a previous chief or sheriff, who is eager to get rid of the problem officer. In other cases, small agencies with limited budgets may fear a costly lawsuit if they dismiss an officer through a formal disciplinary process. An officer who is facing a misconduct dismissal will often threaten the agency and its governmental entity with costly, lengthy, and unflattering litigation for wrongful discipline or wrongful unfit or adverse termination and make such claims public. An officer finally can often negotiate a positive departure from an agency once they realize that they can no longer continue to work there. They can leave with an apparent clean and positive record and the agency is simply relieved to be rid of the officer, who goes to another unsuspecting agency.

Attempts to report problem officers by agencies can be overruled and overturned by administrative law hearings and actions. Such a ruling can be interpreted as a rebuke of the agency and can be a basis for the officer to litigate against the reporting agency. Fear of this potential outcome is also a factor in many agency heads simply taking the path of least resistance and giving a separating officer a positive report of separation.

Most states have a consolidated retirement system for state, county and municipal peace officers, which is unaffected by transfers between agencies so long as continued employment occurs and can thus further provide incentive for both good and bad officers to move frequently between agencies.

See also

Job rotation
Parish transfers of abusive Catholic priests
Police accountability

References

Law enforcement controversies in the United States
Police misconduct in the United States
Accountability